Michael Coppola may refer to:

Michael J. Coppola (1942–2005), member of the Massachusetts House of Representatives
Mike Coppola (1900–1966), Michael "Trigger Mike" Coppola, member of the Genovese crime family
Mikey Coppola (born 1946), Michael "Mikey Cigars" Coppola, member of the Genovese crime family

See also
 Coppola (surname)